Duncan Shaw (27 January 1925 – 20 February 2018) was a Scottish Presbyterian minister, historian, and author. He served as Moderator of the General Assembly of the Church of Scotland from 1987 to 1988.

Early life and education
Shaw was born on 27 January 1925 in Edinburgh, Scotland: he grew up in a tenement flat in the Meadowbank area of the city. He was educated at Broughton High School, a state school in Broughton, Edinburgh. After leaving school, he was a law apprentice.

In February 1943, at the age of 18, Shaw enlisted into the Royal Electrical Mechanical Engineers (REME) to serve during the Second World War. He went on to hold every rank between lance corporal and Warrant Officer Class 1 (the most senior non-commissioned rank). He served in the United Kingdom and in India, before being demobbed in October 1947. It was while serving in the British Army that he first grew a handlebar moustache for which he was noted for wearing.

Returning to Scotland after the war, Shaw decided to join the ministry rather than continue his legal career. From 1947 to 1951, he studied at the University of Edinburgh. He continued his studies at Edinburgh: he undertook research for a Doctor of Philosophy (PhD) degree in Scottish history under the supervision of Professor Gordon Donaldson. His doctoral thesis was titled "The origin and development of the General Assembly of the Church of Scotland, 1560–1600", and was completed in 1962. He was awarded a Doctor of Theology (ThDr) degree by the Charles University in Prague in 1969.

Ordained ministry
Shaw was ordained for the Church of Scotland and installed as minister of St Margaret's Church, Dumbiedykes, Edinburgh on 29 July 1951. He tended to serve in churches in working-class communities. He moved to become minister of St Christopher's Church, Craigentinny, Edinburgh in 1959, and served there until he retired on 3 January 1997.

Moderator
Shaw was elected Moderator of the General Assembly of the Church of Scotland, in succession to Robert Craig. He served as moderator from 1987 to 1988. He invited Margaret Thatcher, the then prime minister, to address the Assembly when it met in May 1988: her address was known as the Sermon on the Mound.

Personal life
In 1955, Shaw married Ilse Pieter (died 1989). Together they had three children. In 1991, he married for a second time to Anna Libera Dallapiccola, a professor at the University of Heidelberg.

In 2005, Shaw helped re-establish the Clan Shaw of Argyll and the Isles: he appointed its Representer (equivalent to clan chief) by the Lord Lyon King of Arms. The clan had been annihilated by Clan Campbell in 1614. He had previously tried an failed to claim the Barony of Craigentinny.

Shaw died in Edinburgh on 20 February 2018, aged 93.

Selected works

References

1925 births
2018 deaths
20th-century Ministers of the Church of Scotland
Moderators of the General Assembly of the Church of Scotland
20th-century Scottish historians
People educated at Broughton High School, Edinburgh
Royal Electrical and Mechanical Engineers soldiers
British Army personnel of World War II
Alumni of the University of Edinburgh
Charles University alumni
Recipients of the Order of Merit of the Federal Republic of Germany
21st-century Scottish historians